High-Definition Multimedia Interface (HDMI) is a proprietary audio/video interface for transmitting uncompressed video data and compressed or uncompressed digital audio data from an HDMI-compliant source device, such as a display controller, to a compatible computer monitor, video projector, digital television, or digital audio device. HDMI is a digital replacement for analog video standards.

HDMI implements the EIA/CEA-861 standards, which define video formats and waveforms, transport of compressed and uncompressed LPCM audio, auxiliary data, and implementations of the VESA EDID. CEA-861 signals carried by HDMI are electrically compatible with the CEA-861 signals used by the Digital Visual Interface (DVI). No signal conversion is necessary, nor is there a loss of video quality when a DVI-to-HDMI adapter is used. The Consumer Electronics Control (CEC) capability allows HDMI devices to control each other when necessary and allows the user to operate multiple devices with one handheld remote control device.

Several versions of HDMI have been developed and deployed since the initial release of the technology, occasionally introducing new connectors with smaller form factors, but all versions still use the same basic pinout and are compatible with all connector types and cables. Other than improved audio and video capacity, performance, resolution and color spaces, newer versions have optional advanced features such as 3D, Ethernet data connection, and CEC extensions.

Production of consumer HDMI products started in late 2003. In Europe, either DVI-HDCP or HDMI is included in the HD ready in-store labeling specification for TV sets for HDTV, formulated by EICTA with SES Astra in 2005. HDMI began to appear on consumer HDTVs in 2004 and camcorders and digital still cameras in 2006. , nearly 10 billion HDMI devices have been sold.

History
The HDMI founders were Hitachi, Panasonic, Philips, Silicon Image, Sony, Thomson, and Toshiba. Digital Content Protection, LLC provides HDCP (which was developed by Intel) for HDMI. HDMI has the support of motion picture producers Fox, Universal, Warner Bros. and Disney, along with system operators DirecTV, EchoStar (Dish Network) and CableLabs.

The HDMI founders began development on HDMI 1.0 on April 16, 2002, with the goal of creating an AV connector that was backward-compatible with DVI. At the time, DVI-HDCP (DVI with HDCP) and DVI-HDTV (DVI-HDCP using the CEA-861-B video standard) were being used on HDTVs. HDMI 1.0 was designed to improve on DVI-HDTV by using a smaller connector and adding audio capability and enhanced  capability and consumer electronics control functions.

The first Authorized Testing Center (ATC), which tests HDMI products, was opened by Silicon Image on June 23, 2003, in California, United States. The first ATC in Japan was opened by Panasonic on May 1, 2004, in Osaka. The first ATC in Europe was opened by Philips on May 25, 2005, in Caen, France. The first ATC in China was opened by Silicon Image on November 21, 2005, in Shenzhen. The first ATC in India was opened by Philips on June 12, 2008, in Bangalore. The HDMI website contains a list of all the ATCs.

According to In-Stat, the number of HDMI devices sold was 5 million in 2004, 17.4 million in 2005, 63 million in 2006, and 143 million in 2007. HDMI has become the de facto standard for HDTVs, and according to In-Stat, around 90% of digital televisions in 2007 included HDMI. In-Stat has estimated that 229 million HDMI devices were sold in 2008. On April 8, 2008 there were over 850 consumer electronics and PC companies that had adopted the HDMI specification (HDMI adopters). On January 7, 2009, HDMI Licensing, LLC announced that HDMI had reached an installed base of over 600 million HDMI devices. In-Stat has estimated that 394 million HDMI devices would sell in 2009 and that all digital televisions by the end of 2009 would have at least one HDMI input.

On January 28, 2008, In-Stat reported that shipments of HDMI were expected to exceed those of DVI in 2008, driven primarily by the consumer electronics market.

In 2008, PC Magazine awarded a Technical Excellence Award in the Home Theater category for an "innovation that has changed the world" to the CEC portion of the HDMI specification. Ten companies were given a Technology and Engineering Emmy Award for their development of HDMI by the National Academy of Television Arts and Sciences on January 7, 2009.

On October 25, 2011, the HDMI Forum was established by the HDMI founders to create an open organization so that interested companies can participate in the development of the HDMI specification. All members of the HDMI Forum have equal voting rights, may participate in the Technical Working Group, and if elected can be on the Board of Directors. There is no limit to the number of companies allowed in the HDMI Forum though companies must pay an annual fee of US$15,000 with an additional annual fee of $5,000 for those companies that serve on the Board of Directors. The Board of Directors is made up of 11 companies who are elected every 2 years by a general vote of HDMI Forum members. All future development of the HDMI specification take place in the HDMI Forum and are built upon the HDMI 1.4b specification. Also on the same day HDMI Licensing, LLC announced that there were over 1,100 HDMI adopters and that over 2 billion HDMI-enabled products had shipped since the launch of the HDMI standard. From October 25, 2011, all development of the HDMI specification became the responsibility of the newly created HDMI Forum.

On January 8, 2013, HDMI Licensing, LLC announced that there were over 1,300 HDMI adopters and that over 3 billion HDMI devices had shipped since the launch of the HDMI standard. The day also marked the 10th anniversary of the release of the first HDMI specification.

, nearly 10 billion HDMI devices had been sold.

Specifications
The HDMI specification defines the protocols, signals, electrical interfaces and mechanical requirements of the standard. The maximum pixel clock rate for HDMI 1.0 is 165 MHz, which is sufficient to allow 1080p and WUXGA (1920×1200) at 60Hz. HDMI 1.3 increases that to 340 MHz, which allows for higher resolution (such as WQXGA, 2560×1600) across a single digital link. An HDMI connection can either be single-link (type A/C/D) or dual-link (type B) and can have a video pixel rate of 25 MHz to 340 MHz (for a single-link connection) or 25 MHz to 680 MHz (for a dual-link connection). Video formats with rates below 25 MHz (e.g., 13.5 MHz for 480i/NTSC) are transmitted using a pixel-repetition scheme.

Audio/video
HDMI uses the Consumer Electronics Association/Electronic Industries Alliance 861 standards. HDMI 1.0 to HDMI 1.2a uses the EIA/CEA-861-B video standard, HDMI 1.3 uses the CEA-861-D video standard, and HDMI 1.4 uses the CEA-861-E video standard. The CEA-861-E document defines "video formats and waveforms; colorimetry and quantization; transport of compressed and uncompressed LPCM audio; carriage of auxiliary data; and implementations of the Video Electronics Standards Association (VESA) Enhanced Extended Display Identification Data Standard (E-EDID)". On July 15, 2013, the CEA announced the publication of CEA-861-F, a standard that can be used by video interfaces such as DVI, HDMI, and LVDS. CEA-861-F adds the ability to transmit several Ultra HD video formats and additional color spaces.

To ensure baseline compatibility between different HDMI sources and displays (as well as backward compatibility with the electrically compatible DVI standard) all HDMI devices must implement the sRGB color space at 8 bits per component. Ability to use the  color space and higher color depths ("deep color") is optional. HDMI permits sRGB 4:4:4 chroma subsampling (8–16 bits per component), xvYCC 4:4:4 chroma subsampling (8–16 bits per component),  4:4:4 chroma subsampling (8–16 bits per component), or  4:2:2 chroma subsampling (8–12 bits per component). The color spaces that can be used by HDMI are ITU-R BT.601, ITU-R BT.709-5 and IEC 61966-2-4.

For digital audio, if an HDMI device has audio, it is required to implement the baseline format: stereo (uncompressed) PCM. Other formats are optional, with HDMI allowing up to 8 channels of uncompressed audio at sample sizes of 16 bits, 20 bits, or 24 bits, with sample rates of 32kHz, 44.1kHz, 48kHz, 88.2kHz, 96kHz, 176.4kHz, or 192kHz. HDMI also carries any IEC 61937-compliant compressed audio stream, such as Dolby Digital and DTS, and up to 8 channels of one-bit DSD audio (used on Super Audio CDs) at rates up to four times that of Super Audio CD. With version 1.3, HDMI allows lossless compressed audio streams Dolby TrueHD and DTS-HD Master Audio. As with the  video, audio capability is optional. Audio return channel (ARC) is a feature introduced in the HDMI 1.4 standard. "Return" refers to the case where the audio comes from the TV and can be sent "upstream" to the AV receiver using the HDMI cable connected to the AV receiver. An example given on the HDMI website is that a TV that directly receives a terrestrial/satellite broadcast, or has a video source built in, sends the audio "upstream" to the AV receiver.

The HDMI standard was not designed to pass closed caption data (for example, subtitles) to the television for decoding. As such, any closed caption stream must be decoded and included as an image in the video stream(s) prior to transmission over an HDMI cable to appear on the DTV. This limits the caption style (even for digital captions) to only that decoded at the source prior to HDMI transmission. This also prevents closed captions when transmission over HDMI is required for upconversion. For example, a DVD player that sends an upscaled 720p/1080i format via HDMI to an HDTV has no way to pass Closed Captioning data so that the HDTV can decode it, as there is no line 21 VBI in that format.

Communication channels
HDMI has three physically separate communication channels, which are the DDC, TMDS and the optional CEC. HDMI 1.4 added ARC and HEC.

Display Data Channel (DDC)

The Display Data Channel (DDC) is a communication channel based on the I2C bus specification. HDMI specifically requires the device implement the Enhanced Display Data Channel (E-DDC), which is used by the HDMI source device to read the E-EDID data from the HDMI sink device to learn what audio/video formats it can take. HDMI requires that the E-DDC implement I2C standard mode speed (100 kbit/s) and allows it to optionally implement fast mode speed (400 kbit/s).

The DDC channel is actively used for High-bandwidth Digital Content Protection (HDCP).

Transition-minimized differential signaling (TMDS)
Transition-minimized differential signaling (TMDS) on HDMI interleaves video, audio and auxiliary data using three different packet types, called the video data period, the data island period and the control period. During the video data period, the pixels of an active video line are transmitted. During the data island period (which occurs during the horizontal and vertical blanking intervals), audio and auxiliary data are transmitted within a series of packets. The control period occurs between video and data island periods.

Both HDMI and DVI use TMDS to send 10-bit characters that are encoded using 8b/10b encoding that differs from the original IBM form for the video data period and 2b/10b encoding for the control period. HDMI adds the ability to send audio and auxiliary data using 4b/10b encoding for the data island period. Each data island period is 32 pixels in size and contains a 32-bit packet header, which includes 8 bits of BCH ECC parity data for error correction and describes the contents of the packet. Each packet contains four subpackets, and each subpacket is 64 bits in size, including 8 bits of BCH ECC parity data, allowing for each packet to carry up to 224 bits of audio data. Each data island period can contain up to 18 packets. Seven of the 15 packet types described in the HDMI 1.3a specifications deal with audio data, while the other 8 types deal with auxiliary data. Among these are the general control packet and the gamut metadata packet. The general control packet carries information on AVMUTE (which mutes the audio during changes that may cause audio noise) and color depth (which sends the bit depth of the current video stream and is required for deep color). The gamut metadata packet carries information on the color space being used for the current video stream and is required for xvYCC.

Consumer Electronics Control (CEC)

Consumer Electronics Control (CEC) is an HDMI feature designed to allow the user to command and control up to 15 CEC-enabled devices, that are connected through HDMI, by using only one of their remote controls (for example by controlling a television set, set-top box, and DVD player using only the remote control of the TV). CEC also allows for individual CEC-enabled devices to command and control each other without user intervention.

It is a one-wire bidirectional serial bus that is based on the CENELEC standard AV.link protocol to perform remote control functions. CEC wiring is mandatory, although implementation of CEC in a product is optional. It was defined in HDMI Specification 1.0 and updated in HDMI 1.2, HDMI 1.2a and HDMI 1.3a (which added timer and audio commands to the bus). USB to CEC adapters exist that allow a computer to control CEC-enabled devices.

HDMI Ethernet and Audio Return Channel
Introduced in HDMI 1.4, HDMI Ethernet and Audio Return Channel (HEAC) adds a high-speed bidirectional data communication link (HEC) and the ability to send audio data upstream to the source device (ARC). HEAC utilizes two lines from the connector: the previously unused Reserved pin (called HEAC+) and the Hot Plug Detect pin (called HEAC−). If only ARC transmission is required, a single mode signal using the HEAC+ line can be used, otherwise, HEC is transmitted as a differential signal over the pair of lines, and ARC as a common mode component of the pair.
     

Audio Return Channel (ARC)

ARC is an audio link meant to replace other cables between the TV and the A/V receiver or speaker system. This direction is used when the TV is the one that generates or receives the video stream instead of the other equipment. A typical case is the running of an app on a smart TV such as Netflix, but reproduction of audio is handled by the other equipment. Without ARC, the audio output from the TV must be routed by another cable, typically TOSLink or RCA, into the speaker system. 

HDMI Ethernet Channel (HEC)

HDMI Ethernet Channel technology consolidates video, audio, and data streams into a single HDMI cable, and the HEC feature enables IP-based applications over HDMI and provides a bidirectional Ethernet communication at 100 Mbit/s. The physical layer of the Ethernet implementation uses a hybrid to simultaneously send and receive attenuated 100BASE-TX-type signals through a single twisted pair.

Compatibility with DVI

HDMI is backward compatible with single-link Digital Visual Interface digital video (DVI-D or DVI-I, but not DVI-A or dual-link DVI). No signal conversion is required when an adapter or asymmetric cable is used, so there is no loss of video quality.

From a user's perspective, an HDMI display can be driven by a single-link DVI-D source, since HDMI and DVI-D define an overlapping minimum set of allowed resolutions and frame-buffer formats to ensure a basic level of interoperability. In the reverse case, a DVI-D monitor has the same level of basic interoperability unless content protection with High-bandwidth Digital Content Protection (HDCP) interferes—or the HDMI color encoding is in component color space  instead of RGB, which is not possible in DVI. An HDMI source, such as a Blu-ray player, may require an HDCP-compliant display, and refuse to output HDCP-protected content to a non-compliant display. A further complication is that there is a small amount of display equipment, such as some high-end home theater projectors, designed with HDMI inputs but not HDCP-compliant.

Any DVI-to-HDMI adapter can function as an HDMI-to-DVI adapter (and vice versa). Typically, the only limitation is the gender of the adapter's connectors and the gender of the cables and sockets it is used with.

Features specific to HDMI, such as remote-control and audio transport, are not available in devices that use legacy DVI-D signalling. However, many devices output HDMI over a DVI connector (e.g., ATI 3000-series and NVIDIA GTX 200-series video cards), and some multimedia displays may accept HDMI (including audio) over a DVI input. Exact capabilities beyond basic compatibility vary. Adapters are generally bi-directional.

Content protection (HDCP)

High-bandwidth Digital Content Protection (HDCP) is a newer form of digital rights management. Intel created the original technology to make sure that digital content followed the guidelines set by the Digital Content Protection group.

HDMI can use HDCP to encrypt the signal if required by the source device. CSS, CPRM and AACS require the use of HDCP on HDMI when playing back encrypted DVD Video, DVD Audio, HD DVD and Blu-ray Disc. The HDCP Repeater bit controls the authentication and switching/distribution of an HDMI signal. According to HDCP Specification 1.2 (beginning with HDMI CTS 1.3a), any system that implements HDCP must do so in a fully compliant manner. HDCP testing that was previously only a requirement for optional tests such as the "Simplay HD" testing program is now part of the requirements for HDMI compliance. HDCP accommodates up to 127 connected devices with up to 7 levels, using a combination of sources, sinks and repeaters. A simple example of this is several HDMI devices connected to an HDMI AV receiver that is connected to an HDMI display.

Devices called HDCP strippers can remove the HDCP information from the video signal so the video can play on non-HDCP-compliant displays, though a fair use and non-disclosure form must usually be signed with a registering agency before use.

Connectors

There are five HDMI connector types. Type A/B are defined in the HDMI 1.0 specification, type C is defined in the HDMI 1.3 specification, and type D/E are defined in the HDMI 1.4 specification.

 Type A  The plug (male) connector outside dimensions are 13.9 mm × 4.45 mm, and the receptacle (female) connector inside dimensions are 14 mm × 4.55 mm. There are 19 pins, with bandwidth to carry all SDTV, EDTV, HDTV, UHD, and 4K modes. It is electrically compatible with single-link DVI-D.

 Type B This connector is 21.2 mm × 4.45 mm and has 29 pins, carrying six differential pairs instead of three, for use with very high-resolution displays such as WQUXGA (3840×2400). It is electrically compatible with dual-link DVI-D, but  has not yet been used in any products. With the introduction of HDMI 1.3, the maximum bandwidth of single-link HDMI exceeded that of dual-link DVI-D. As of HDMI 1.4, the pixel clock rate crossover frequency from single to dual-link has not been defined.

 Type C  This Mini connector is smaller than the type A plug, measuring 10.42 mm × 2.42 mm but has the same 19-pin configuration. It is intended for portable devices. The differences are that all positive signals of the differential pairs are swapped with their corresponding shield, the DDC/CEC Ground is assigned to pin 13 instead of pin 17, the CEC is assigned to pin 14 instead of pin 13, and the reserved pin is 17 instead of pin 14. The type C Mini connector can be connected to a type A connector using a type A-to-type C cable.

 Type D  This Micro connector shrinks the connector size to something resembling a micro-USB connector, measuring only 5.83 mm × 2.20 mm For comparison, a micro-USB connector is 6.85 mm × 1.8 mm and a USB Type-A connector is 11.5 mm × 4.5 mm. It keeps the standard 19 pins of types A and C, but the pin assignment is different from both.

 Type E  The Automotive Connection System has a locking tab to keep the cable from vibrating loose and a shell to help prevent moisture and dirt from interfering with the signals.

The HDMI alternate mode lets a user connect the reversible USB-C connector with the HDMI source devices (mobile, tablet, laptop). This cable connects to video display/sink devices using any of the native HDMI connectors. This is an HDMI cable, in this case a USB-C to HDMI cable.

Cables

An HDMI cable is composed of four shielded twisted pairs, with impedance of the order of 100 Ω (±15%), plus seven separate conductors. HDMI cables with Ethernet differ in that three of the separate conductors instead form an additional shielded twisted pair (with the CEC/DDC ground as a shield).

Although no maximum length for an HDMI cable is specified, signal attenuation (dependent on the cable's construction quality and conducting materials) limits usable lengths in practice and certification is difficult to achieve for lengths beyond 13 m. HDMI 1.3 defines two cable categories: Category 1-certified cables, which have been tested at 74.25 MHz (which would include resolutions such as 720p60 and 1080i60), and Category 2-certified cables, which have been tested at 340 MHz (which would include resolutions such as 1080p60 and 4K30). Category 1 HDMI cables are marketed as "Standard" and Category 2 HDMI cables as "High Speed". This labeling guideline for HDMI cables went into effect on October 17, 2008. Category 1 and 2 cables can either meet the required parameter specifications for inter-pair skew, far-end crosstalk, attenuation and differential impedance, or they can meet the required non-equalized/equalized eye diagram requirements. A cable of about  can be manufactured to Category 1 specifications easily and inexpensively by using 28 AWG (0.081 mm2) conductors. Many HDMI cables under 5 meters of length that were made before the HDMI 1.3 specification can work as Category 2 cables, but only Category 2-tested cables are guaranteed to work for Category 2 purposes.

As of the HDMI 1.4 specification, the following cable types are defined for HDMI in general:

 Standard HDMI Cable up to 1080i and 720p
 Standard HDMI Cable with Ethernet
 Standard Automotive HDMI Cable
 High Speed HDMI Cable 1080p, 4K 30Hz, 3D and deep color
 High Speed HDMI Cable with Ethernet

A new certification program was introduced in October 2015 to certify that cables work at the 18 Gbit/s maximum bandwidth of the HDMI 2.0 specification. In addition to expanding the set of cable testing requirements, the certification program introduces an EMI test to ensure cables minimize interference with wireless signals. These cables are marked with an anti-counterfeiting authentication label and are defined as:
 Premium High Speed HDMI Cable
 Premium High Speed HDMI Cable with Ethernet

In conjunction with the HDMI 2.1 specification, a third category of cable was announced on January 4, 2017, called "48G". Also known as Category 3 HDMI or "Ultra High Speed" HDMI, the cable is designed to support the 48Gbit/s bandwidth of HDMI 2.1, supporting 4K, 5K, 8K and 10K at 120Hz. The cable is backwards compatible with the earlier HDMI devices, using existing HDMI type A, C and D connectors, and includes HDMI Ethernet.
 Ultra High Speed HDMI Cable (48G Cable) 4K, 5K, 8K and 10K at 120Hz

Extenders
An HDMI extender is a single device (or pair of devices) powered with an external power source or with the 5V DC from the HDMI source. Long cables can cause instability of HDCP and blinking on the screen, due to the weakened DDC signal that HDCP requires. HDCP DDC signals must be multiplexed with TMDS video signals to comply with HDCP requirements for HDMI extenders based on a single Category 5/Category 6 cable. Several companies offer amplifiers, equalizers and repeaters that can string several standard HDMI cables together.

Licensing

The HDMI specification is not an open standard; manufacturers need to be licensed by HDMI LA in order to implement HDMI in any product or component. Companies that are licensed by HDMI LA are known as HDMI Adopters.

DVI is the only interface that does not require a license for interfacing HDMI.

HDMI adopters

While earlier versions of HDMI specs are available to the public for download, only adopters have access to the latest standards (HDMI 1.4b/2.1).  Only adopters have access to the compliance test specification (CTS) that is used for compliance and certification.  Compliance testing is required before any HDMI product can be legally sold.

 Adopters have IP rights under Adopter Agreement.
 Adopters receive the right to use HDMI logos and TMs on their products and marketing materials.
 Adopters are listed on the HDMI website.
 Products from adopters are listed and marketed in the official HDMI product finder database.
 Adopters receive more exposure through combined marketing, such as the annual HDMI Developers Conference and technology seminars.

HDMI fee structure

There are 2 annual fee structures associated with being an HDMI adopter:

The annual fee is due upon the execution of the Adopter Agreement, and must be paid on the anniversary of this date each year thereafter.

The royalty fee structure is the same for all volumes. The following variable per-unit royalty is device-based and not dependent on number of ports, chips or connectors:

  for each end-user licensed product

Use of HDMI logo requires compliance testing. Adopters need to license HDCP separately.

The HDMI royalty is only payable on licensed products that will be sold on a stand-alone basis (i.e. that are not incorporated into another licensed product that is subject to an HDMI royalty). For example, if a cable or IC is sold to an adopter who then includes it in a television subject to a royalty, then the cable or IC maker would not pay a royalty, and the television manufacturer would pay the royalty on the final product. If the cable is sold directly to consumers, then the cable would be subject to a royalty.

Versions
HDMI devices are manufactured to adhere to various versions of the specification, in which each version is given a number or letter, such as 1.0, 1.2, or 1.4b. Each subsequent version of the specification uses the same kind of cable but increases the bandwidth or capabilities of what can be transmitted over the cable. A product listed as having an HDMI version does not necessarily mean that it has all features in that version, since some HDMI features are optional, such as deep color and xvYCC (which is branded by Sony as "x.v.Color"). Since the release of HDMI 1.4, the HDMI Licensing Administrator, Inc. (which oversees the HDMI standard) has banned the use of version numbers to identify cables. Non-cable HDMI products, starting on January 1, 2012, may no longer reference the HDMI number, and must state which features of the HDMI specification the product implements.

Version 1.0
HDMI 1.0 was released on December 9, 2002, and is a single-cable digital audio/video connector interface. The link architecture is based on DVI, using exactly the same video transmission format but sending audio and other auxiliary data during the blanking intervals of the video stream. HDMI 1.0 allows a maximum TMDS clock of 165MHz (4.95Gbit/s bandwidth per link), the same as DVI. It defines two connectors called Type A and Type B, with pinouts based on the Single-Link DVI-D and Dual-Link DVI-D connectors respectively, though the Type B connector was never used in any commercial products. Color depth of 10bpc (30bit/px) or 12bpc (36bit/px) is allowed when using 4:2:2 subsampling, but only 8bpc (24bit/px) color depth is permitted when using RGB or  4:4:4. Only the Rec. 601 and Rec. 709 color spaces are supported. HDMI 1.0 allows only specific pre-defined video formats, including all the formats defined in EIA/CEA-861-B and some additional formats listed in the HDMI Specification itself. All HDMI sources/sinks must also be capable of sending/receiving native Single-Link DVI video and be fully compliant with the DVI Specification.

Version 1.1
HDMI 1.1 was released on May 20, 2004, and added support for DVD-Audio.

Version 1.2
HDMI 1.2 was released on August 8, 2005, and added the option of One Bit Audio, used on Super Audio CDs, at up to 8 channels. To make HDMI more suitable for use on PC devices, version 1.2 also removed the requirement that only explicitly supported formats be used. It added the ability for manufacturers to create vendor-specific formats, allowing any arbitrary resolution and refresh rate rather than being limited to a pre-defined list of supported formats. In addition, it added explicit support for several new formats including 720p at 100 and 120 Hz and relaxed the pixel format support requirements so that sources with only native RGB output (PC sources) would not be required to support  output.

HDMI 1.2a was released on December 14, 2005 and fully specifies Consumer Electronic Control (CEC) features, command sets and CEC compliance tests.

Version 1.3

HDMI 1.3 was released on June 22, 2006, and increased the maximum TMDS clock to 340MHz (10.2Gbit/s). It added support for 10bpc, 12bpc, and 16bpc color depth (30, 36, and 48bit/px), called deep color. It also added support for the xvYCC color space, in addition to the ITU-R BT.601 and BT.709 color spaces supported by previous versions, and added the ability to carry metadata defining color gamut boundaries. It also optionally allows output of Dolby TrueHD and DTS-HD Master Audio streams for external decoding by AV receivers. It incorporates automatic audio syncing (audio video sync) capability. It defined cable Categories 1 and 2, with Category 1 cable being tested up to 74.25MHz and Category 2 being tested up to 340 MHz. It also added the new HDMI Type C "Mini" connector for portable devices.

HDMI 1.3a was released on November 10, 2006, and had cable and sink modifications for HDMI Type C, source termination recommendations, and removed undershoot and maximum rise/fall time limits. It also changed CEC capacitance limits, and CEC commands for timer control were brought back in an altered form, with audio control commands added. It also added the optional ability to stream SACD in its bitstream DST format rather than uncompressed raw DSD.

Version 1.4

HDMI 1.4 was released on June 5, 2009, and first came to market after Q2 of 2009. Retaining the bandwidth of the previous version, HDMI 1.4 defined standardized timings to use for 40962160 at 24Hz, 38402160 at 24, 25, and 30Hz, and added explicit support for 19201080 at 120Hz with CTA-861 timings. It also added an HDMI Ethernet Channel (HEC) that accommodates a 100 Mbit/s Ethernet connection between the two HDMI connected devices so they can share an Internet connection, introduced an audio return channel (ARC), 3D Over HDMI, a new Micro HDMI Connector, an expanded set of color spaces with the addition of sYCC601, Adobe RGB and Adobe YCC601, and an Automotive Connection System. HDMI 1.4 defined several stereoscopic 3D formats including field alternative (interlaced), frame packing (a full resolution top-bottom format), line alternative full, side-by-side half, side-by-side full, 2D + depth, and 2D + depth + graphics + graphics depth (WOWvx). HDMI 1.4 requires that 3D displays implement the frame packing 3D format at either 720p50 and 1080p24 or 720p60 and 1080p24. High Speed HDMI cables as defined in HDMI 1.3 work with all HDMI 1.4 features except for the HDMI Ethernet Channel, which requires the new High Speed HDMI Cable with Ethernet defined in HDMI 1.4.

HDMI 1.4a was released on March 4, 2010, and added two mandatory 3D formats for broadcast content, which was deferred with HDMI 1.4 pending the direction of the 3D broadcast market. HDMI 1.4a has defined mandatory 3D formats for broadcast, game, and movie content. HDMI 1.4a requires that 3D displays implement the frame packing 3D format at either 720p50 and 1080p24 or 720p60 and 1080p24, side-by-side horizontal at either 1080i50 or 1080i60, and top-and-bottom at either 720p50 and 1080p24 or 720p60 and 1080p24.

HDMI 1.4b was released on October 11, 2011, containing only minor clarifications to the 1.4a document. HDMI 1.4b is the last version of the standard that HDMI LA is responsible for. All future versions of the HDMI Specification were produced by the HDMI Forum, created on October 25, 2011.

Version 2.0
HDMI 2.0, referred to by some manufacturers as HDMI UHD, was released on September 4, 2013.

HDMI 2.0 increases the maximum bandwidth to 18.0 Gbit/s. HDMI 2.0 uses TMDS encoding for video transmission like previous versions, giving it a maximum video bandwidth of 14.4 Gbit/s. This enables HDMI 2.0 to carry 4K video at 60 Hz with 24 bit/px color depth. Other features of HDMI 2.0 include support for the Rec. 2020 color space, up to 32 audio channels, up to 1536 kHz audio sample frequency, dual video streams to multiple users on the same screen, up to four audio streams, 4:2:0 chroma subsampling, 25 fps 3D formats, support for the 21:9 aspect ratio, dynamic synchronization of video and audio streams, the HE-AAC and DRA audio standards, improved 3D capability, and additional CEC functions.

HDMI 2.0a was released on April 8, 2015, and added support for High Dynamic Range (HDR) video with static metadata.

HDMI 2.0b was released March, 2016. HDMI 2.0b initially supported the same HDR10 standard as HDMI 2.0a as specified in the CTA-861.3 specification. In December 2016 additional support for HDR Video transport was added to HDMI 2.0b in the CTA-861-G specification, which extends the static metadata signaling to include hybrid log–gamma (HLG).

Version 2.1
HDMI 2.1 was officially announced by the HDMI Forum on January4, 2017, and was released on November 28, 2017. It adds support for higher resolutions and higher refresh rates, including 4K 120Hz and 8K 60Hz. HDMI 2.1 also introduces a new HDMI cable category called Ultra High Speed (referred to as 48G during development), which certifies cables at the new higher speeds that these formats require. Ultra High Speed HDMI cables are backwards compatible with older HDMI devices, and older cables are compatible with new HDMI 2.1 devices, though the full 48Gbit/s bandwidth is only supported with the new cables.

The following features were added to the HDMI 2.1 Specification:

 Maximum supported format is 10K at 120Hz
 Dynamic HDR for specifying HDR metadata on a scene-by-scene or even a frame-by-frame basis
 Note: While HDMI 2.1 did standardize transport of dynamic HDR metadata over HDMI, in actuality it only formalized dynamic metadata interfaces already utilized by Dolby Vision and HDR10+ in HDMI 2.0, which is why neither Dolby Vision nor HDR10+ require HDMI 2.1 to function properly.
 Display Stream Compression (DSC) 1.2 is used for video formats higher than 8K with 4:2:0 chroma subsampling
 High Frame Rate (HFR) for 4K, 8K, and 10K, which adds support for refresh rates up to 120Hz
 Enhanced Audio Return Channel (eARC) for object-based audio formats such as Dolby Atmos and DTS:X
 Enhanced refresh rate and latency reduction features:
 Variable Refresh Rate (VRR) reduces or eliminates lag, stutter and frame tearing for more fluid motion in games
 Quick Media Switching (QMS) for movies and video eliminates the delay that can result in blank screens before content begins to be displayed
 Quick Frame Transport (QFT) reduces latency by bursting individual pictures across the HDMI link as fast as possible when the link's hardware supports more bandwidth than the minimum amount needed for the resolution and frame rate of the content. With QFT, individual pictures arrive earlier and some hardware blocks can be fully powered off for longer periods of time between pictures to reduce heat generation and extend battery life.
 Auto Low Latency Mode (ALLM) When a display device supports the option to either optimize its pixel processing for best latency or best pixel processing, ALLM allows the current HDMI source device to automatically select, based on its better understanding of the nature of its own content, which mode the user would most likely prefer.

Video formats that require more bandwidth than 18.0Gbit/s (4K 60Hz 8bpc RGB), such as 4K 60Hz 10bpc (HDR), 4K 120Hz, and 8K 60Hz, may require the new "Ultra High Speed" or "Ultra High Speed with Ethernet" cables. HDMI 2.1's other new features are supported with existing HDMI cables.

The increase in maximum bandwidth is achieved by increasing both the bitrate of the data channels and the number of channels. Previous HDMI versions use three data channels (each operating at up to 6.0Gbit/s in HDMI 2.0, or up to 3.4Gbit/s in HDMI 1.4), with an additional channel for the TMDS clock signal, which runs at a fraction of the data channel speed (one tenth the speed, or up to 340MHz, for signaling rates up to 3.4Gbit/s; one fortieth the speed, or up to 150MHz, for signaling rates between 3.4 and 6.0Gbit/s). HDMI 2.1 doubles the signaling rate of the data channels to 12Gbit/s. The structure of the data has been changed to use a new packet-based format with an embedded clock signal, which allows what was formerly the TMDS clock channel to be used as a fourth data channel instead, increasing the signaling rate across that channel to 12Gbit/s as well. These changes increase the aggregate bandwidth from 18.0Gbit/s (3 × 6.0Gbit/s) to 48.0Gbit/s (4 × 12.0Gbit/s), a 2.66× improvement in bandwidth. In addition, the data is transmitted more efficiently by using a 16b/18b encoding scheme, which uses a larger percentage of the bandwidth for data rather than DC balancing compared to the TMDS scheme used by previous versions (88.% compared to 80%). This, in combination with the 2.66× bandwidth, raises the maximum data rate of HDMI 2.1 from 14.4Gbit/s to 42.Gbit/s. Subtracting overhead for FEC, the usable data rate is approximately 42.0Gbit/s, around 2.92× the data rate of HDMI 2.0.

The 48Gbit/s bandwidth provided by HDMI 2.1 is enough for 8K resolution at approximately 50Hz, with 8bpc RGB or  4:4:4 color. Using DSC, formats up to 8K 120Hz or 10K 100Hz at 8bpc RGB/4:4:4 are possible. Using  with 4:2:2 or 4:2:0 chroma subsampling in combination with DSC can allow for even higher formats.
	
HDMI 2.1a was released on February 15, 2022, and added support for Source-Based Tone Mapping (SBTM).

Version comparison

The "version" of a connection depends on the versions of the HDMI ports on the source and sink devices, not on the HDMI cable. The different categories of HDMI cable only affect the bandwidth (maximum resolution / refresh rate) of the connection. Other features such as audio, 3D, chroma subsampling, or variable refresh rate depend only on the versions of the ports, and are not affected by what type of HDMI cable is used. The only exception to this is Ethernet-over-HDMI, which requires an "HDMI with Ethernet" cable.

Products are not required to implement all features of a version to be considered compliant with that version, as most features are optional. For example, displays with HDMI 1.4 ports do not necessarily support the full 340 MHz TMDS clock allowed by HDMI 1.4; they are commonly limited to lower speeds such as 300 MHz (1080p 120 Hz) or even as low as 165 MHz (1080p 60 Hz) at the manufacturer's discretion, but are still considered HDMI 1.4-compliant. Likewise, features like 10 bpc (30 bit/px) color depth may also not be supported, even if the HDMI version allows it and the display supports it over other interfaces such as DisplayPort.

Feature support will therefore vary from device to device, even within the same HDMI version.

Main specifications

Refresh frequency limits for common resolutions

The maximum limits for TMDS transmission are calculated using standard data rate calculations. For FRL transmission, the limits are calculated using the capacity computation algorithm provided by the HDMI Specification. All calculations assume uncompressed RGB video with CVT-RB v2 timing. Maximum limits may differ if compression (i.e. DSC) or  4:2:0 chroma subsampling are used.

Display manufacturers may also use non-standard blanking intervals (a Vendor-Specific Timing Format as defined in the HDMI Specification) rather than CVT-RB v2 to achieve even higher frequencies when bandwidth is a constraint. The refresh frequencies in the below table do not represent the absolute maximum limit of each interface, but rather an estimate based on a modern standardized timing formula. The minimum blanking intervals (and therefore the exact maximum frequency that can be achieved) will depend on the display and how many secondary data packets it requires, and therefore will differ from model to model.

Refresh frequency limits for standard video
HDMI 1.0 and 1.1 are restricted to transmitting only certain video formats, defined in EIA/CEA-861-B and in the HDMI Specification itself. HDMI 1.2 and all later versions allow any arbitrary resolution and frame rate (within the bandwidth limit). Formats that are not supported by the HDMI Specification (i.e., no standardized timings defined) may be implemented as a vendor-specific format. Successive versions of the HDMI Specification continue to add support for additional formats (such as 4K resolutions), but the added support is to establish standardized timings to ensure interoperability between products, not to establish which formats are or aren't permitted. Video formats do not require explicit support from the HDMI Specification in order to be transmitted and displayed.

Individual products may have heavier limitations than those listed below, since HDMI devices are not required to support the maximum bandwidth of the HDMI version that they implement. Therefore, it is not guaranteed that a display will support the refresh rates listed in this table, even if the display has the required HDMI version.

Uncompressed 8bpc (24bit/px) color depth and RGB or  4:4:4 color format are assumed on this table except where noted.

Refresh frequency limits for HDR10 video
HDR10 requires 10bpc (30bit/px) color depth, which uses 25% more bandwidth than standard 8bpc video.

Uncompressed 10bpc color depth and RGB or  4:4:4 color format are assumed on this table except where noted.

Feature support

The features defined in the HDMI Specification that an HDMI device may implement are listed below. For historical interest, the version of the HDMI Specification in which the feature was first added is also listed. All features of the HDMI Specification are optional; HDMI devices may implement any combination of these features.

Although the "HDMI version numbers" are commonly misused as a way of indicating that a device supports certain features, this notation has no official meaning and is considered improper by HDMI Licensing. There is no officially-defined correlation between features supported by a device and any claimed "version numbers", as version numbers refer to historical editions of the HDMI Specification document, not to particular classes of HDMI devices. Manufacturers are forbidden from describing their devices using HDMI version numbers, and are required to identify support for features by listing explicit support for them, but the HDMI forum has received criticism for lack of enforcement of these policies.

 Full HD Blu-ray Disc and HD DVD video (version 1.0)
 Consumer Electronic Control (CEC) (version 1.0)
 DVD-Audio (version 1.1)
 Super Audio CD (DSD) (version 1.2)
 Auto Lip-Sync Correction (version 1.3)
 Dolby TrueHD / DTS-HD Master Audio bitstream capable (version 1.3)
 Updated list of CEC commands (version 1.3a)
 3D video (version 1.4)
 Ethernet channel (100Mbit/s) (version 1.4)
 Audio return channel (ARC) (version 1.4)
 4 audio streams (version 2.0)
 Dual View (version 2.0)
 Perceptual quantizer HDR EOTF (SMPTE ST 2084) (version 2.0a)
 Hybrid log–gamma (HLG) HDR EOTF (version 2.0a)
 Static HDR metadata (SMPTE ST 2086) (version 2.0a)
 Dynamic HDR metadata (SMPTE ST 2094) (version 2.0b)
 Enhanced audio return channel (eARC) (version 2.1)
 Variable Refresh Rate (VRR) (version 2.1)
 Quick Media Switching (QMS) (version 2.1)
 Quick Frame Transport (QFT) (version 2.1)
 Auto Low Latency Mode (ALLM) (version 2.1)
 Display Stream Compression (DSC) (version 2.1)
 Source-Based Tone Mapping (SBTM) (version 2.1a)

Display Stream Compression

Display Stream Compression (DSC) is a VESA-developed video compression algorithm designed to enable increased display resolutions and frame rates over existing physical interfaces, and make devices smaller and lighter, with longer battery life.

Applications

Blu-ray Disc and HD DVD players
Blu-ray Disc and HD DVD, introduced in 2006, offer high-fidelity audio features that require HDMI for best results. HDMI 1.3 can transport Dolby Digital Plus, Dolby TrueHD, and DTS-HD Master Audio bitstreams in compressed form. This capability allows for an AV receiver with the necessary decoder to decode the compressed audio stream. The Blu-ray specification does not include video encoded with either deep color or xvYCC; thus, HDMI 1.0 can transfer Blu-ray discs at full video quality.

The HDMI 1.4 specification (released in 2009) added support for 3D video and is used by all Blu-ray 3D compatible players.

The Blu-ray Disc Association (BDA) spokespersons have stated (Sept. 2014 at IFA show in Berlin, Germany) that the Blu-ray, Ultra HD players, and 4K discs are expected to be available starting in the second half to 2015. It is anticipated that such Blu-ray UHD players will be required to include a HDMI 2.0 output that supports HDCP 2.2.

Blu-ray permits secondary audio decoding, whereby the disc content can tell the player to mix multiple audio sources together before final output. Some Blu-ray and HD DVD players can decode all of the audio codecs internally and can output LPCM audio over HDMI. Multichannel LPCM can be transported over an HDMI connection, and as long as the AV receiver implements multichannel LPCM audio over HDMI and implements HDCP, the audio reproduction is equal in resolution to HDMI 1.3 bitstream output. Some low-cost AV receivers, such as the Onkyo TX-SR506, do not allow audio processing over HDMI and are labelled as "HDMI pass through" devices. Virtually all modern AV Receivers now offer HDMI 1.4 inputs and outputs with processing for all of the audio formats offered by Blu-ray Discs and other HD video sources. During 2014 several manufacturers introduced premium AV Receivers that include one, or multiple, HDMI 2.0 inputs along with a HDMI 2.0 output(s). However, not until 2015 did most major manufacturers of AV receivers also support HDCP 2.2 as needed to support certain high quality UHD video sources, such as Blu-ray UHD players.

Digital cameras and camcorders
Most consumer camcorders, as well as many digital cameras, are equipped with a mini-HDMI connector (type C connector).

Some cameras also have 4K capability,
although cameras capable of HD video often include an HDMI interface for playback or even live preview, the image processor and the video processor of cameras usable for uncompressed video must be able to deliver the full image resolution at the specified frame rate in real time without any missing frames causing jitter. Therefore, usable uncompressed video out of HDMI is often called "clean HDMI".

Personal computers

Personal computer (PCs) with a DVI interface are capable of video output to an HDMI-enabled monitor. Some PCs include an HDMI interface and may also be capable of HDMI audio output, depending on specific hardware. For example, Intel's motherboard chipsets since the 945G and NVIDIA's GeForce 8200/8300 motherboard chipsets are capable of 8-channel LPCM output over HDMI. Eight-channel LPCM audio output over HDMI with a video card was first seen with the ATI Radeon HD 4850, which was released in June 2008 and is implemented by other video cards in the ATI Radeon HD 4000 series. Linux can drive 8-channel LPCM audio over HDMI if the video card has the necessary hardware and implements the Advanced Linux Sound Architecture (ALSA). The ATI Radeon HD 4000 series implements ALSA. Cyberlink announced in June 2008 that they would update their PowerDVD playback software to allow 192 kHz/24-bit Blu-ray Disc audio decoding in Q3-Q4 of 2008. Corel's WinDVD 9 Plus currently has 96 kHz/24-bit Blu-ray Disc audio decoding.

Even with an HDMI output, a computer may not be able to produce signals that implement HDCP, Microsoft's Protected Video Path, or Microsoft's Protected Audio Path. Several early graphic cards were labelled as "HDCP-enabled" but did not have the hardware needed for HDCP; this included some graphic cards based on the ATI X1600 chipset and certain models of the NVIDIA Geforce 7900 series. The first computer monitors that could process HDCP were released in 2005; by February 2006 a dozen different models had been released. The Protected Video Path was enabled in graphic cards that had HDCP capability, since it was required for output of Blu-ray Disc and HD DVD video. In comparison, the Protected Audio Path was required only if a lossless audio bitstream (such as Dolby TrueHD or DTS-HD MA) was output. Uncompressed LPCM audio, however, does not require a Protected Audio Path, and software programs such as PowerDVD and WinDVD can decode Dolby TrueHD and DTS-HD MA and output it as LPCM. A limitation is that if the computer does not implement a Protected Audio Path, the audio must be downsampled to 16-bit 48 kHz but can still output at up to 8 channels. No graphic cards were released in 2008 that implemented the Protected Audio Path.

The Asus Xonar HDAV1.3 became the first HDMI sound card that implemented the Protected Audio Path and could both bitstream and decode lossless audio (Dolby TrueHD and DTS-HD MA), although bitstreaming is only available if using the ArcSoft TotalMedia Theatre software. It has an HDMI 1.3 input/output, and Asus says that it can work with most video cards on the market.

In September 2009, AMD announced the ATI Radeon HD 5000 series video cards, which have HDMI 1.3 output (deep color, xvYCC wide gamut capability and high bit rate audio), 8-channel LPCM over HDMI, and an integrated HD audio controller with a Protected Audio Path that allows bitstream output over HDMI for AAC, Dolby AC-3, Dolby TrueHD and DTS-HD Master Audio formats. The ATI Radeon HD 5870 released in September 2009 is the first video card that allows bitstream output over HDMI for Dolby TrueHD and DTS-HD Master Audio. The AMD Radeon HD 6000 Series implements HDMI 1.4a. The AMD Radeon HD 7000 Series implements HDMI 1.4b.

In December 2010, it was announced that several computer vendors and display makers including Intel, AMD, Dell, Lenovo, Samsung, and LG would stop using LVDS (actually, FPD-Link) from 2013 and legacy DVI and VGA connectors from 2015, replacing them with DisplayPort and HDMI.

On August 27, 2012, Asus announced a new  monitor that produces its native resolution of 2560×1440 via HDMI 1.4.

On September 18, 2014, Nvidia launched GeForce GTX 980 and GTX 970 (with GM204 chip) with HDMI 2.0 support. On January 22, 2015, GeForce GTX 960 (with GM206 chip) launched with HDMI 2.0 support. On March 17, 2015, GeForce GTX TITAN X (GM200) launched with HDMI 2.0 support. On June 1, 2015, GeForce GTX 980 Ti (with GM200 chip) launched with HDMI 2.0 support. On August 20, 2015, GeForce GTX 950 (with GM206 chip) launched with HDMI 2.0 support.

On May 6, 2016, Nvidia launched the GeForce GTX 1080 (GP104 GPU) with HDMI 2.0b support.

On September 1, 2020, Nvidia launched the GeForce RTX 30 series, the world's first discrete graphics cards with support for the full 48Gbit/s bandwidth with Display Stream Compression 1.2 of HDMI 2.1.

Gaming consoles
Beginning with the seventh generation of video game consoles, most consoles support HDMI. Video game consoles that support HDMI include the Xbox 360 (1.2a), Xbox One (1.4b), Xbox One S (2.0a), Xbox One X (2.0b), PlayStation 3 (1.3a), PlayStation 4 (1.4b), PlayStation 4 Pro (2.0a), Wii U (1.4a), Nintendo Switch (1.4b), Nintendo Switch (OLED model) (2.0a), Xbox Series X and Series S (2.1), and PlayStation 5 (2.1).

Tablet computers

Some tablet computers implement HDMI using Micro-HDMI (Type D) port , while others like the Eee Pad Transformer implement the standard using mini-HDMI (type C) ports. All iPad models have a special A/V adapter that converts Apple's  Lightning (connector) to a standard HDMI (Type A) port. Samsung has a similar proprietary thirty-pin port for their Galaxy Tab 10.1 that could adapt to HDMI as well as USB drives. The Dell Streak 5 smartphone/tablet hybrid is capable of outputting over HDMI. While the Streak uses a PDMI port, a separate cradle adds HDMI compatibility. Some tablets running Android OS provide HDMI output using a mini-HDMI (type C) port. Most new laptops and desktops now have built in HDMI as well.

Mobile phones
Many mobile phones can produce an output of HDMI video via a micro-HDMI connector, SlimPort, MHL or other adapter.

Legacy compatibility
HDMI can only be used with older analog-only devices (using connections such as SCART, VGA, RCA, etc.) by means of a digital-to-analog converter or AV receiver, as the interface does not carry any analog signals (unlike DVI, where devices with DVI-I ports accept or provide either digital or analog signals). Cables are available that contain the necessary electronics, but it is important to distinguish these active converter cables from passive HDMI to VGA cables (which are typically cheaper as they don't include any electronics). The passive cables are only useful if a user has a device that is generating or expecting HDMI signals on a VGA connector, or VGA signals on an HDMI connector; this is a non-standard feature, not implemented by most devices.

HDMI Alternate Mode for USB Type-C
The HDMI Alternate Mode for USB-C allows HDMI-enabled sources with a USB-C connector to directly connect to standard HDMI display devices, without requiring an adapter. The standard was released in September 2016, and supports all HDMI 1.4b features such as video resolutions up to Ultra HD 30 Hz and CEC. Previously, the similar DisplayPort Alternate Mode could be used to connect to HDMI displays from USB Type-C sources, but where in that case, active adapters were required to convert from DisplayPort to HDMI, HDMI Alternate Mode connects to the display natively.

The Alternate Mode reconfigures the four SuperSpeed differential pairs present in USB-C to carry the three HDMI TMDS channels and the clock signal. The two Sideband Use pins (SBU1 and SBU2) are used to carry the HDMI Ethernet and Audio Return Channel and the Hot Plug Detect functionality (HEAC+/Utility pin and HEAC−/HPD pin). As there are not enough reconfigurable pins remaining in USB-C to accommodate the DDC clock (SCL), DDC data (SDA), and CEC these three signals are bridged between the HDMI source and sink via the USB Power Delivery 2.0 (USB-PD) protocol, and are carried over the USB-C Configuration Channel (CC) wire. This is possible because the cable is electronically marked (i.e., it contains a USB-PD node) that serves to tunnel the DDC and CEC from the source over the Configuration Channel to the node in the cable, these USB-PD messages are received and relayed to the HDMI sink as regenerated DDC (SCL and SDA signals), or CEC signals.

As stated at CES in January 2023, HDMI Alternate Mode for USB Type-C is no longer being updated as there are no known products using this protocol, reducing its relevance in the current market. This will reduce consumer confusion as DisplayPort Alternate Mode is the primary video protocol of choice over USB-C.

Relationship with DisplayPort

The DisplayPort audio/video interface was introduced in May 2006. In recent years, DisplayPort connectors have become a common feature of premium products—displays, desktop computers, and video cards; most of the companies producing DisplayPort equipment are in the computer sector. The DisplayPort website states that DisplayPort is expected to complement HDMI, but  100% of HD and UHD TVs had HDMI connectivity. DisplayPort supported some advanced features which are useful for multimedia content creators and gamers (e.g. 5K, Adaptive-Sync), which was the reason most GPUs have DisplayPort. These features were added to the official HDMI specification slightly later, but with the introduction of HDMI 2.1, these gaps are already leveled off (with e.g. VRR / Variable Refresh Rate).

DisplayPort uses a self-clocking, micro-packet-based protocol that allows for a variable number of differential pair lanes as well as flexible allocation of bandwidth between audio and video, and allows encapsulating multi-channel compressed audio formats in the audio stream. DisplayPort 1.2 supports multiple audio/video streams, variable refresh rate (FreeSync), and Dual-mode transmitters compatible with HDMI 1.2 or 1.4. Revision 1.3 increases overall transmission bandwidth to 32.4Gbit/s with the new HBR3 mode featuring 8.1Gbit/s per lane; it requires Dual-mode with mandatory HDMI 2.0 compatibility and HDCP 2.2. Revision 1.4 adds Display Stream Compression (DSC), support for the BT.2020 color space, and HDR10 extensions from CTA-861.3, including static and dynamic metadata.

The DisplayPort features an adapter detection mechanism enabling dual-mode operation and the transmission of TMDS signals allowing the conversion to DVI and HDMI 1.2/1.4/2.0 signals using a passive adapter.  The same external connector is used for both protocols when a DVI/HDMI passive adapter is attached, the transmitter circuit switches to TMDS mode. DisplayPort Dual-mode ports and cables/adapters are typically marked with the DisplayPort++ logo. Thunderbolt ports with mDP connector also supports Dual-mode passive HDMI adapters/cables. Conversion to dual-link DVI and component video (VGA/YPbPr) requires active powered adapters.

The USB 3.1 Type-C connector is an emerging standard that replaces legacy video connectors such as mDP, Thunderbolt, HDMI, and VGA in mobile devices. USB-C connectors can transmit DisplayPort video to docks and displays using standard USB Type-C cables or Type-C to DisplayPort cables and adapters; USB-C also supports HDMI adapters that actively convert from DisplayPort to HDMI 1.4 or 2.0. DisplayPort Alternate Mode for USB Type-C specification was published in 2015. USB Type-C chipsets are not required to include Dual-mode, so passive DP-HDMI adapters do not work with Type-C sources.

DisplayPort has a royalty rate of US$0.20 per unit (from patents licensed by MPEG LA), while HDMI has an annual fee of US$10,000 and a per unit royalty rate of between $0.04 and $0.15.

HDMI has a few advantages over DisplayPort, such as ability to carry Consumer Electronics Control (CEC) signals, and electrical compatibility with DVI (though practically limited to single-link DVI rates). Also, HDMI can sustain full bandwidth for up to 10 meters of cable length and there are certification programs to ensure this. VESA states that DisplayPort is specified and tested to run 15 metres without the need for a booster station, though Dell advises that problems can occur with DisplayPort cables longer than 1.8 metres. However, active cable solutions and fiber optic cable extender solutions can be used to extend effective DisplayPort distances.

Relationship with MHL

Mobile High-Definition Link (MHL) is an adaptation of HDMI intended to connect mobile devices such as smartphones and tablets to high-definition televisions (HDTVs) and displays. Unlike DVI, which is compatible with HDMI using only passive cables and adapters, MHL requires that the HDMI socket be MHL-enabled, otherwise an active adapter (or dongle) is required to convert the signal to HDMI. MHL is developed by a consortium of five consumer electronics manufacturers, several of which are also behind HDMI.

MHL pares down the three TMDS channels in a standard HDMI connection to a single one running over any connector that provides at least five pins. This lets existing connectors in mobile devices such as micro-USB be used, avoiding the need for additional dedicated video output sockets. The USB port switches to MHL mode when it detects a compatible device is connected.

In addition to the features in common with HDMI (such as HDCP encrypted uncompressed high-definition video and eight-channel surround sound), MHL also adds the provision of power charging for the mobile device while in use, and also enables the TV remote to control it. Although support for these additional features requires connection to an MHL-enabled HDMI port, power charging can also be provided when using active MHL to HDMI adapters (connected to standard HDMI ports), provided there is a separate power connection to the adapter.

Like HDMI, MHL defines a USB-C Alternate Mode to support the MHL standard over USB-C connections.

Version 1.0 supported 720p/1080i 60 Hz (RGB/4:4:4 pixel encoding) with a bandwidth of 2.25 Gbit/s. Versions 1.3 and 2.0 added support for 1080p 60 Hz ( 4:2:2) with a bandwidth of 3 Gbit/s in PackedPixel mode. Version 3.0 increased the bandwidth to 6 Gbit/s to support Ultra HD (3840 × 2160) 30 Hz video, and also changed from being frame-based, like HDMI, to packet-based.

The fourth version, superMHL, increased bandwidth by operating over multiple TMDS differential pairs (up to a total of six) allowing a maximum of 36 Gbit/s. The six lanes are supported over a reversible 32-pin superMHL connector, while four lanes are supported over USB-C Alternate Mode (only a single lane is supported over micro-USB/HDMI). Display Stream Compression (DSC) is used to allow up to 8K Ultra HD (7680 × 4320) 120 Hz HDR video, and to support Ultra HD 60 Hz video over a single lane.

See also
 List of display interfaces
 DisplayPort
 Thunderbolt (interface)
 USB-C
 Wireless HDMI

References

External links

 HDMI Licensing, LLC.
 Dolby Podcast Episode 60 – March 26, 2009 Part one of a two-part discussion with Steve Venuti, President, and Jeff Park, Technology Evangelist, of HDMI Licensing.
 Dolby Podcast Episode 62 – April 23, 2009 Part two of a two-part discussion with Steve Venuti, President, and Jeff Park, Technology Evangelist, of HDMI Licensing.

Audiovisual connectors
Audiovisual introductions in 2002
Computer connectors
Computer display standards
Digital display connectors
Film and video technology
High-definition television
Japanese inventions
Television technology
Television terminology
Television transmission standards
Video signal
Serial buses